Hilbert Shirey is an American professional poker player.

Shirey has won three bracelets at the World Series of Poker and has also cashed in more than 20 other WSOP events.

Shirey won his first WSOP bracelet in 1987 in a No Limit Hold'em event.  His other two bracelets both came in 1995, one in Pot Limit Hold'em and the other Pot Limit Omaha.

In Rick Reilly's book Who's Your Caddy, Shirey is noted as "Hillstreet" in the Dewey Tomko chapter.

He is longtime golf partners with Tomko, and currently resides in Winter Haven, Florida.

As of 2010, his total live tournament winnings exceed $1,480,000. His 25 cashes at the WSOP account for $794,142 of those winnings.

World Series of Poker Bracelets

References

External links
Cardplayer.com profile

American poker players
World Series of Poker bracelet winners
Living people
Year of birth missing (living people)